Artion Alillari (born 11 September 1995) is an Albanian professional footballer who currently play as a midfielder for Albanian club Dinamo Tirana. In January 2022, he was expelled from Pogradeci due to indiscipline.

References

1995 births
Living people
People from Pogradec
People from Korçë County
Albanian footballers
Association football midfielders
Association football forwards
Kategoria e Parë players
KS Pogradeci players